Maniatty is a surname. Notable people with the surname include:
 Antoinette Maniatty (born 1965), American materials scientist
 Nick Constantine Maniatty (Nicco), American singer and songwriter